Chikkerur  is a village in the southern state of Karnataka, India. It is located in the Hirekerur taluk of Haveri district in Karnataka.

Demographics
 India census, Chikkerur had a population of 6820 with 3515 males and 3305 females.
Village having many archeological evidences of Sanskrit Pandits and ancient Sanskrit school to train up pupils from Mysuru palace
A renowned Veterinary Scientist Dr.Mohankumar Shettar born in this village.

See also
 Haveri
 Districts of Karnataka

References

External links
 http://Haveri.nic.in/

Villages in Haveri district